The Fletcher Union Church, also known as the Fletcher Community House, is a historic former church building on TH 1 (Cambridge Road) in Fletcher, Vermont.  Built in 1871, it is one of only a few public buildings in the small community, and has for over a century been a secular community meeting space.  It was listed on the National Register of Historic Places in 1982.

Description and history
The former Fletcher Union Church stands in a rural area of Fletcher, prominently visible on a rise at a bend in Cambridge Road east of Fairfax Road.  It is a single-story wood-frame structure, set on a stone foundation whose rear is exposed on the sloping lot.  It has a gabled roof with slightly elongated eaves, and its exterior is clapboarded.  A square tower projects at the center of the front facade, rising through a tall and plain first stage to a smaller square louvered belfry stage capped by a shallow-pitch pyramidal roof.  The main entrance is at the base of the tower, with a sash window above.  The interior begins with a vestibule area, from which stairs rise to a gallery.  The main hall has a stage at the far end, added in 1919.  The basement houses a kitchen, bathrooms, and a dining or meeting space.

The church was built in 1871 by N.R. Bingham, a prominent regional master builder.  It was a replacement for the town's first church, built in 1830 across the street from this location.  Both the original and this church were union churches, built to provide facilities shared by a number of congregations.  The last documented use of the building for religious purposes was in 1899, by a Universalist group.  The town took over the building in 1908, converting it into a community meeting house.  It has been used for community meetings, social events, and meetings of the local Grange chapter.

See also
National Register of Historic Places listings in Franklin County, Vermont

References

Buildings and structures in Fletcher, Vermont
Churches on the National Register of Historic Places in Vermont
Italianate architecture in Vermont
Churches completed in 1871
19th-century churches in the United States
Churches in Franklin County, Vermont
National Register of Historic Places in Franklin County, Vermont
Italianate church buildings in the United States